Raymond Martin (born 22 May 1949) is a former French road bicycle racer. In the 1980 Tour de France he finished third overall and won the mountains classification. He also competed in the individual road race at the 1972 Summer Olympics.

Major results

1972
 National Amateur Road Race Championship
1974
GP Ouest-France
Lescouet-Jugon
Route Niveroise
1975
Paris–Camembert
1978
Grand Prix de Plumelec-Morbihan
Josselin
1979
Paris–Camembert
1980
Agon-Coutainville
Lescouet-Jugon
Trophée des Grimpeurs
Tour de France:
Winner stage 13
 Winner mountains classification
3rd place overall classification
1982
Tour de France:
8th place overall classification

References

External links
 
 Official Tour de France results for Raymond Martin (cyclist)
 
 
 

1949 births
Living people
French male cyclists
French Tour de France stage winners
Olympic cyclists of France
Cyclists at the 1972 Summer Olympics
Sportspeople from Orne
Cyclists from Normandy